Georgi D. Dimitrov (born April 13, 1958) is a Bulgarian sociologist and Professor at the European Studies department of Sofia University. Doctor Habilis in Sociology (2000). He works in the field of historical sociology. Major works on: history and sociology of sociology, education reform, modernity, European civilisation, Bulgarian society.

External links
 CV in Bulgarian

Academic staff of Sofia University
Living people
Bulgarian sociologists
1958 births